The consensus 1963 College Basketball All-American team as determined by aggregating the results of five major All-American teams.  To earn "consensus" status, a player must win honors from a majority of the following teams: the Associated Press, the USBWA, The United Press International, the National Association of Basketball Coaches, and the Newspaper Enterprise Association (NEA).  1963 was the last year that the NEA was used to determine consensus All-American teams.

1963 Consensus All-America team

Individual All-America teams

AP Honorable Mention:

 Terry Baker, Oregon State
 Rick Barry, Miami (Florida)
 Bill Buntin, Michigan
 Joe Caldwell, Arizona State
 Ken Charlton, Colorado
 Mel Counts, Oregon State
 Billy Cunningham, North Carolina
 Tom Dose, Stanford
 Dave Downey, Illinois
 Vinnie Ernst, Providence
 Mel Garland, Purdue
 Ira Harge, New Mexico
 Lyle Harger, Houston
 Mack Herndon, Bradley
 Fred Hetzel, Davidson
 Layton Johns, Auburn
 Gus Johnson, Idaho
 Jim Kerwin, Tulane
 Don Kessinger, Ole Miss
 Jeff Mullins, Duke
 Willie Murrell, Kansas State
 Flynn Robinson, Wyoming
 Paul Silas, Creighton
 Dave Stallworth, Wichita State
 Red Stroud, Mississippi State
 Nate Thurmond, Bowling Green
 George Wilson, Cincinnati

Academic All-Americans
Academic All-American teams were selected for the first time in 1963.

See also
 1962–63 NCAA University Division men's basketball season

References

NCAA Men's Basketball All-Americans
All-Americans